Chelis hauensteini is a moth in the family Erebidae. It was described by Peter Kautt in 1996. It is found in Tibet, China.

This species was moved from the genus Palearctia to Chelis as a result of phylogenetic research published in 2016.

References

Moths described in 1996
Arctiina